The 1993 TranSouth 500 was the fifth stock car race of the 1993 NASCAR Winston Cup Series season and the 37th iteration of the event. The race was held on Sunday, March 28, 1993, in Darlington, South Carolina, at Darlington Raceway, a  permanent egg-shaped oval racetrack. The race took the scheduled 367 laps to complete. At race's end, Richard Childress Racing driver Dale Earnhardt would manage to overcome a first half struggle and dominate the second half of the race to take his 54th career NASCAR Winston Cup Series victory and his first victory of the season. To fill out the top three, Roush Racing driver Mark Martin and Joe Gibbs Racing driver Dale Jarrett would finish second and third, respectively.

Background 

Darlington Raceway is a race track built for NASCAR racing located near Darlington, South Carolina. It is nicknamed "The Lady in Black" and "The Track Too Tough to Tame" by many NASCAR fans and drivers and advertised as "A NASCAR Tradition." It is of a unique, somewhat egg-shaped design, an oval with the ends of very different configurations, a condition which supposedly arose from the proximity of one end of the track to a minnow pond the owner refused to relocate. This situation makes it very challenging for the crews to set up their cars' handling in a way that is effective at both ends.

Entry list 

 (R) denotes rookie driver.

Qualifying 
Two round of qualifying were scheduled to be held on Friday, March 26, and Saturday, March 27. However, Friday's sessions were cancelled due to rain, with both rounds then scheduled to commence on Saturday.  However, Saturday's sessions would also be cancelled due to rain, leaving qualifying to be determined by a system of owner's points and postmarks on entry list blanks. The top 30 positions would be determined by the current 1993 owner's points, while the final nine spots would be determined by a system of provisionals that included past winners, and finally postmarks. As a result, Richard Childress Racing driver Dale Earnhardt would win the pole.

John McFadden was the only driver to fail to qualify.

Full qualifying results

Race results

Standings after the race 

Drivers' Championship standings

Note: Only the first 10 positions are included for the driver standings.

References 

1993 NASCAR Winston Cup Series
NASCAR races at Darlington Raceway
March 1993 sports events in the United States
1993 in sports in South Carolina